Bruno Nobili (born 7 October 1949 in Valencia, Venezuela) is an Italian-Venezuelan professional football coach and a former player, who played as a midfielder.

Career
Nobili began playing professional football with Roma, where he made his Serie A debut against Varese on 27 April 1969. Nobili spent a season in Serie A with Cagliari but is best known for his career with Maceratese and with Pescara which included two promotions to Serie A. He was a central figure in the team's midfield during this period.

Overall, he played 4 seasons (64 games, 11 goals) in the Serie A for A.S. Roma, Cagliari Calcio and Delfino Pescara 1936.

Personal life
Bruno's father was Renato Nobili and his mother Silvana Bertazzi. He has 4 brothers (Tullio, Cesare, Marco, Fausto) and 1 sister (Mara). He has two sons (Simone e Danielle) and a daughter (Chiara) and is married to Anna.

References

External links
Profile (ArchivioRossoblu)

1949 births
Living people
Italian footballers
Serie A players
A.S. Roma players
Ascoli Calcio 1898 F.C. players
U.S. Avellino 1912 players
Cagliari Calcio players
Delfino Pescara 1936 players
Italian football managers
Venezuelan football managers
Venezuelan expatriate footballers
Venezuelan footballers
Venezuelan expatriate sportspeople in Italy
Expatriate footballers in Italy
Association football midfielders
S.S. Maceratese 1922 players
Sportspeople from Valencia, Venezuela